WMA may refer to:

Organizations
 Western Manufactured Housing Communities Association, a nonprofit trade association in California, US
 Western Marble Arch, a synagogue in London
 William Morris Agency, literary and entertainment agents, now known as WME Entertainment
 World Masters Athletics, a sport governing body
 World Medical Association, an international confederation of free professional Medical Associations
 World Marketing Alliance, former name of the World Financial Group
 Warsash Maritime Academy, in Hampshire, UK
 Wilbraham & Monson Academy, a prep school in Massachusetts

Science and technology
 Weighted moving average, in statistics
 Windows Media Audio, a digital audio file format created by Microsoft
 Wireless Messaging API, in Java ME MIDP

Music
 "W.M.A." (Pearl Jam song)
 World Music Awards
 World Metal Alliance, a music organization
 Western Music Association, in country music

Other uses
 Washington metropolitan area, Washington D.C. and its surrounding area
 Western martial arts, the study of historical manuscripts to teach students the martial arts of Europe
 Wildlife Management Area, for the conservation of wildlife and for recreational activities involving wildlife
 Ways and means advances, a credit policy used by Reserve Bank of India
 War Measures Act, an emergency measure formerly in Canadian Parliamentary law

See also
 WMAS (disambiguation)